Jasmin Nejati (born 4 May 1994) is a Swedish footballer who plays for Umeå IK in the Damallsvenskan.

External links 
 

1994 births
Living people
Swedish women's footballers
Umeå IK players
Damallsvenskan players
Women's association football defenders